Teen Wolf is an American television series that airs on MTV. The series premiered on Sunday, June 5, 2011, following the 2011 MTV Movie Awards. Teen Wolf is a supernatural drama series that follows Scott McCall (Tyler Posey), a high school student and social outcast who is bitten by a werewolf. He tries to maintain a normal life while hiding his secret and dealing with supernatural dangers that plague the town of Beacon Hills. He is aided by his best friend, Stiles Stilinski (Dylan O'Brien), and mysterious werewolf, Derek Hale (Tyler Hoechlin).

Cast

Secondary characters

References

External links
 Eonline.com

Teen Wolf
Teen Wolf
Teen Wolf (2011 TV series)